Ahmet Akdilek (born 9 March 1988) is a Turkish road cyclist, who last rode for UCI Continental team . In the national team, he is coached by Luka Zele.

He qualified for participation in the men's road race at the 2012 Summer Olympics.  He also competed in the men's time trial.

Major results

2012
 4th Overall Tour of Trakya
2013
 National Road Championships
8th Road race
8th Time trial
2015
 1st  Road race, National Road Championships
 1st  Tour of Çanakkale
1st Prologue
 9th GP Oued Eddahab, Les Challenges de la Marche Verte
2017
 3rd Trophée Princier, Challenge du Prince

References

External links

 
 

1988 births
Living people
Turkish male cyclists
Olympic cyclists of Turkey
Cyclists at the 2012 Summer Olympics
Sportspeople from Konya
20th-century Turkish people
21st-century Turkish people